Pukara (Aymara and Quechua for fortress, also spelled Pucara) is a mountain in the Bolivian Andes which reaches a height of approximately . It is located in the Cochabamba Department, Esteban Arce Province, Sacabamba Municipality. Pukara lies southwest of Atuq Wachana and northwest of Jatun Urqu, southwest of the village of Yana Rumi.

References 

Mountains of Cochabamba Department